Diene Keita is a former Minister for Cooperation and Africa Integration for Guinea. In June 2020, she was appointed deputy executive director for programmes, United Nations Population Fund, by Secretary-General of the United Nations, António Guterres. She has held leadership roles in United Nations Development Programme (UNDP) and United Nations Population Fund (UNFPA), serving in several countries which includes; United States of America, Niger , Burkina Faso , Burundi , Haiti , Senegal , Ethiopia, Mauritania, Benin, Democratic Republic of the Congo and Nigeria.

Early life and education
Keita was born on 19 August 1964 in Guinea. She holds a doctorate in law from Sorbonne University in Paris, where she graduated summa cum laude. She also holds a Diploma in Advanced Studies (DEA) in international economics and development law from Rene Descartes University; Paris, and master's degree in economic and social administration.

Career

United Nations Development Programme (UNDP)
Keita began her United Nations career in 1990 with the United Nations Development Programme (UNDP) in New York City as a Programme Officer, and from this point, held various successful programmatic leadership positions at the country level, serving as UNDP Deputy Representative and Acting Representative for several years. In 2006, she was UNDP Representative to the African Union and to the United Nations Economic Commission for Africa (UNECA), Ethiopia.

United Nations Population Fund
Keita joined UNFPA in 2006 as Representative in Mauritania, and thereafter served in representative positions in Benin, as well as in the Democratic Republic of the Congo and Nigeria.  During this time, Keita successfully led large and complex public health programmes, expanded strategic partnerships and mobilized critical resources to support delivery.  While serving with UNFPA, Keita also acted as United Nations Resident Coordinator in Mauritania and Benin. She is recognised extensively on empowerment of women and youth, inclusive growth, demographic issues, sustainable human development, addressing sexual and reproductive health, and gender-based violence in humanitarian settings.

As a Representative in the two biggest UNFPA public health programmes globally; namely Democratic Republic of Congo (DRC) which has a complex humanitarian context, and Nigeria, which is the most populous country in Africa, she managed the biggest public health programmes in UNFPA while manoeuvring the very complex political, structural and geographical contexts. In these two countries, she led country programmes annually and provided strategic guidance and leadership on the planning, execution, monitoring, evaluation and reporting.

Minister of International Cooperation and African Integration
Keita joined the Guinean Government as a Cabinet Minister in June 2018, and served as the Minister of Integration for Guinea. In her role, she built strategic partnerships and mobilised resources from external and domestic partners. Her role was critical in mobilising external resources and building strong cooperation between the Republic of Guinea and other African countries, including the ECOWAS countries. She increased the portfolio and country mobilisation capabilities in ensure substantive knowledge is shared on the country and they all reach towards agenda 2030.

As the Minister in charge of International Cooperation, she successfully built partnerships, both with the public and private sector, ensuring that all local undertakings met the requirement of global agendas very specifically the Sustainable Development Goals, and AU 2063 while ensuring compliance with national policies. Similarly, she strengthened cooperation between Guinea and its partners by building strategic partnerships with the World Bank, United Nations system, USAID,  Bilaterals, private foundations such as Bill and Melinda Gates Foundation, Global Fund, and private sector multinationals. She served in this capacity until her appointment in UNFPA as deputy executive director of programmes in June 2020.

Honours and awards
Keita has won several awards on the strength of her achievements in maternal health and family planning. She won the Commander of the Order of National Merit, a National Award of the Mauritanian Government. She was also conferred the Commander of the National Order, awarded by the Republic of Benin.

Publications
Keita has co-authored three publications:

 Africa and the Millennium Development Goals ch8: the role of National Stakeholders & their Priorities for achieving the MDGs in Sub-Saharan Africa. Economica, 2004.
 Africa and the Challenges of Governance. Ch6: Gender & governance priorities - Maisonneuve – Larose, 2008.
 The Social and Cultural Barriers to the popularization of Family Planning and to better Maternal Health in Benin – Espérance, 2014.

References

Living people
United Nations officials
United Nations Population Fund
1964 births